God Bless the Child may refer to:

Literature 
 God Bless the Child, 1964 novel by Kristin Hunter
 God Bless the Child, 2003 picture book by Jerry Pinkney of the Billie Holiday and Arthur Herzog Jr. song

Music 
 "God Bless the Child" (Billie Holiday song), covered by many artists
 "God Bless the Child" (Shania Twain song)
 "God Bless the Child", a song by Michelle Featherstone
 God Bless the Child (Guerilla Black album), 2007
 God Bless the Child (Kenny Burrell album), 1971

Television 
 "God Bless the Child" (Law & Order), an episode of Law & Order
 "God Bless the Child", an episode of Dirt
 God Bless the Child (film), a 1988 TV movie starring Mare Winningham